The 1998 Midwestern Collegiate Conference men's basketball tournament took place at the end of the 1999–2000 regular season. The tournament was hosted by WI-Green Bay.

Seeds
All Midwestern Collegiate Conference schools played in the tournament. Teams were seeded by 1997–98 Midwestern Collegiate Conference season record, with a tiebreaker system to seed teams with identical conference records.

Bracket

References

2000 Midwestern Collegiate Conference men's basketball tournament
Horizon League men's basketball tournament
Midwestern Collegiate Conference men's basketball tournament